The CCB (Capacete de Combate Balístico, Portuguese for ballistic combat helmet) is a combat helmet of Brazilian origin in the shape of the U.S. PASGT helmet, issued to the Brazilian Armed Forces in two versions, polymer and kevlar.

Users

References

Combat helmets
Military equipment of Brazil